Hsu Shui-teh (1 August 1931 – 31 March 2021) was a Taiwanese politician. He was the President of the Examination Yuan from 1996 to 2002. He died of pneumonia on 31 March 2021, at the age of 89.

Education
Hsu earned his bachelor's and master's degrees in education from Taiwan Provincial Normal University and National Chengchi University, respectively.

References

|-

|-

|-

|-

|-

|-

1931 births
2021 deaths
Mayors of Kaohsiung
Mayors of Taipei
National Chengchi University alumni
National Taiwan Normal University alumni
Taiwanese Ministers of the Interior
Taiwanese people of Hoklo descent
Taiwanese Presidents of the Examination Yuan
Members of the Kuomintang
Politicians of the Republic of China on Taiwan from Pingtung County
Deaths from pneumonia in Taiwan